The combination of heredity succession to the election. The king is elected by heads of clans, among the son or brothers of King deceased mother's side. This procedure ensures that all clans have a chance to power.

List of Agamwinboni (Rulers) of Orungu Dynasty (Gabon) 

Source : the genealogy has been taken from : Mandji.net

See also 
Kingdom of Orungu
Gabon
Heads of State of Gabon
Colonial Heads of Gabon
Lists of incumbents

Orungu
Gabon history-related lists